Tethinosoma is a genus of beach flies in the family Canacidae. The only known species, T. fulvifrons, is from New Zealand.

References

Canacidae
Monotypic Brachycera genera
Taxa named by John Russell Malloch
Taxa named by Frederick Hutton (scientist)
Diptera of Australasia
Carnoidea genera